Abanda is a Cameroonian surname and given name. People with this name include:

 Patrice Abanda (born 1978), Cameroonian footballer
 Abanda Herman (born 1979), Cameroonian footballer
 Francoise Abanda (born 1997), Canadian tennis player.

Surnames of African origin